The United States Military Government of the Philippine Islands (Spanish: Gobierno militar estadounidense de las Islas Filipinas; Tagalog: Pamahalaang Militar ng Estados Unidos sa Kapuluang Pilipinas) was a military government in the Philippines established by the United States on August 14, 1898, a day after the capture of Manila, with General Wesley Merritt acting as military governor. During military rule (1898–1902), the U.S. military commander governed the Philippines under the authority of the U.S. president as Commander-in-Chief of the United States Armed Forces. After the appointment of a civil Governor-General, the procedure developed that as parts of the country were pacified and placed firmly under American control, responsibility for the area would be passed to the civilian.

General Merritt was succeeded by General Elwell S. Otis as military governor, who in turn was succeeded by General Arthur MacArthur. Major General Adna Chaffee was the final military governor. The position of military governor was abolished in July 1902, after which the civilian office Governor-General became the sole executive authority in the Philippines.

Under the military government, initially with soldiers as teachers; civil and criminal courts were reestablished, including a supreme court; and local governments were established in towns and provinces. The first local election was conducted by General Harold W. Lawton on May 7, 1899, in Baliuag, Bulacan.

Capture of Manila

By June, U.S. and Filipino forces had taken control of most of the islands, except for the walled city of Intramuros. Admiral Dewey and General Merritt were able to work out a bloodless solution with acting Governor-General Fermín Jáudenes. The negotiating parties made a secret agreement to stage a mock battle in which the Spanish forces would be defeated by the American forces, but the Filipino forces would not be allowed to enter the city. This plan minimized the risk of unnecessary casualties on all sides, while the Spanish would also avoid the shame of possibly having to surrender Intramuros to the Filipino forces. On the eve of the mock battle, General Anderson telegraphed Aguinaldo, "Do not let your troops enter Manila without the permission of the American commander. On this side of the Pasig River you will be under fire."

On August 13, with American commanders unaware that a ceasefire had already been signed between Spain and the U.S. on the previous day, American forces captured the city of Manila from the Spanish in the Battle of Manila. The battle started when Dewey's ships bombarded Fort San Antonio Abad, a decrepit structure on the southern outskirts of Manila, and the virtually impregnable walls of Intramuros. In accordance with the plan, the Spanish forces withdrew while U.S. forces advanced. Once a sufficient show of battle had been made, Dewey hoisted the signal "D.W.H.B." (meaning "Do you surrender?), whereupon the Spanish hoisted a white flag and Manila was formally surrendered to U.S. forces.
This battle marked the end of Filipino-American collaboration, as the American action of preventing Filipino forces from entering the captured city of Manila was deeply resented by the Filipinos. This later led to the Philippine–American War (1899–1902), which would prove to be more deadly and costly than the Spanish–American War (1898).

Spanish–American War ends

Article V of the peace protocol signed on August 12 had mandated negotiations to conclude a treaty of peace to begin in Paris not later than October 1, 1898. President McKinley sent a five-man commission, initially instructed to demand no more than Luzon, Guam, and Puerto Rico; which would have provided a limited U.S. empire of pinpoint colonies to support a global fleet and provide communication links. In Paris, the commission was besieged with advice, particularly from American generals and European diplomats, to demand the entire Philippine archipelago. The unanimous recommendation was that "it would certainly be cheaper and more humane to take the entire Philippines than to keep only part of it." On October 28, 1898, McKinley wired the commission that "cessation of Luzon alone, leaving the rest of the islands subject to Spanish rule, or to be the subject of future contention, cannot be justified on political, commercial, or humanitarian grounds.The cessation must be the whole archipeligo or none.The latter is wholly inadmissible, and the former must therefore be required." The Spanish negotiators were furious over the "immodist demands of a conqueror", but their wounded pride was assauged by an offer of twenty million dollars for "Spanish improvements" to the islands. The Spaniards capitulated, and on December 10, 1898, the U.S. and Spain signed the Treaty of Paris, formally ending the Spanish–American War. In Article III, Spain ceded the Philippine archipelago to the United States, as follows: "Spain cedes to the United States the archipelago known as the Philippine Islands, and comprehending the islands lying within the following line: [... geographic description elided ...]. The United States will pay to Spain the sum of twenty million dollars ($20,000,000) within three months after the exchange of the ratifications of the present treaty."

In the U.S., there was a movement for Philippine independence; some said that the U.S. had no right to a land where many of the people wanted self-government. In 1898 Andrew Carnegie, an industrialist and steel magnate, offered to buy the Philippines for $20 million and give it to the Filipinos so that they could be free of United States government.

On November 7, 1900, Spain and the U.S. signed the Treaty of Washington, clarifying that the territories relinquished by Spain to the United States included any and all islands belonging to the Philippine Archipelago, but lying outside the lines described in the Treaty of Paris. That treaty explicitly named the islands of Cagayan Sulu and Sibutu and their dependencies as among the relinquished territories.

Philippine–American War (1899–1902)

Escalatation of tensions

The Spanish had yielded Iloilo to the insurgents in 1898 to trouble the Americans. On January 1, 1899, news had come to Washington, DC, from Manila that American forces, which had been sent to Iloilo under the command of General Marcus Miller, had been confronted by 6,000 armed Filipinos, who refused them permission to land. A Filipino official styling himself "Presidente Lopez of the Federal Government of the Visayas" informed Miller that "foreign troops" would not land "without express orders from the central government of Luzon." On December 21, 1898, McKinley issued a Proclamation of Benevolent Assimilation. General Otis delayed its publication until January 4, 1899 and published a version that had been edited to avoid conveying the meanings of the terms "sovereignty," "protection," and "right of cessation," which occurred in the unedited version. Unknown to Otis, the US Department of War had also sent an enciphered copy of the proclamation to General Marcus Miller in Iloilo for informational purposes. Miller assumed that it was for distribution and, unaware that a politically-expired version had been sent to Aguinaldo, published it in both Spanish and Tagalog translations, which eventually made their way to Aguinaldo. Even before Aguinaldo received the unaltered version and observed the changes in the copy that he had received from Otis, Aguinaldo was already upset that Otis was referred to as "Military Governor of the Philippines" in the unaltered version, which he had received from Otis (the unaltered version said "in the Philippines."). Aguinaldo did not miss the significance of the alteration, which Otis had made without authorization from Washington.

On January 5, Aguinaldo issued a counterproclamation that summarized what he saw as American violations of the ethics of friendship, particularly regarding the events in Iloilo. The proclamation concluded, "Such procedures, so foreign to the dictates of culture and the usages observed by civilized nations, gave me the right to act without observing the usual rules of intercourse. Nevertheless, in order to be correct to the end, I sent to General Otis commissioners charged to solicit him to desist from his rash enterprise, but they were not listened to. My government can not remain indifferent in view of such a violent and aggressive seizure of a portion of its territory by a nation which arrogated to itself the title champion of oppressed nations. Thus it is that my government is disposed to open hostilities if the American troops attempt to take forcible possession of the Visayan Islands. I denounce these acts before the world, in order that the conscience of mankind may pronounce its infallable verdict as to who are the true oppressors of nations and the tormentors of human kind."

After some copies of that proclamation had been distributed, Aguinaldo ordered the recall of undistributed copies and issued another proclamation, which was published the same day in El Heraldo de la Revolucion, the official newspaper of the Philippine Republic: "As in General Otis's proclamation he alluded to some instructions edited by His Excellency the President of the United States, referring to the administration of the matters in the Philippine Islands, I in the name of God, the root and fountain of all justice, and that of all the right which has been visibly granted to me to direct my dear brothers in the difficult work of our regeneration, protest most solemnly against this intrusion of the United States Government on the sovereignty of these islands.

I equally protest in the name of the Filipino people against the said intrusion, because as they have granted their vote of confidence appointing me president of the nation, although I don't consider that I deserve such, therefore I consider it my duty to defend to death its liberty and independence."

Otis, taking both proclamations as a call to arms, strengthened American observation posts and alerted his troops. In the tense atmosphere, some 40,000 Filipinos fled Manila within a period of 15 days.

Meanwhile, Felipe Agoncillo, who had been commissioned by the Philippine Revolutionary Government as Minister Plenipotentiary to negotiate treaties with foreign governments and had attempted to be seated at the negotiations between the US and Spain in Paris, was now in Washington. On January 6, he filed a request for an interview with the President to discuss affairs in the Philippines. The next day, the government officials were surprised to learn that messages to Otis to deal mildly with the rebels and not to force a conflict had become known to Agoncillo and had been cabled by him to Aguinaldo. At the same time, Aguinaldo's protest against General Otis signing himself "Military Governor of the Philippines" arrived. On January 8, Agoncillo stated, "In my opinion the Filipino people, whom I represent, will never consent to become a colony dependency of the United States. The soldiers of the Filipino army have pledged their lives that they will not lay down their arms until General Aguinaldo tells them to do so, and they will keep that pledge, I feel confident."

The Filipino committees in London, Paris, and Madrid around that time telegraphed to President McKinley: "We protest against the disembarkation of American troops at Iloilo. The treaty of peace still unratified, the American claim to sovereignty is premature. Pray reconsider the resolution regarding Iloilo. Filipinos wish for the friendship of America and abhor militarism and deceit."

On January 8, Aguinaldo received the following message from Teodoro Sandiko to the President of the Revolutionary Government, Malolos, from Sandico, Manila. January 8, 1899, 9.40 p.m., "In consequence of the order of General Rios to his officers, as soon as the Filipino attack begins the Americans should be driven into the Intramuros district and the walled city should be set on fire. Pipi."

The New York Times reported on January 8 that two Americans who had been guarding a waterboat in Iloilo had been attacked, one fatally, and that insurgents were threatening to destroy the business section of the city by fire and that on January 10, a peaceful solution to the Iloilo issues may result but that Aguinaldo had issued a proclamation threatening to drive the Americans from the islands.

By January 10, insurgents were ready to assume the offensive but desired, if possible, to provoke the Americans into firing the first shot. They made no secret of their desire for conflict but increased their hostile demonstrations and pushed their lines forward into forbidden territory. Their attitude was well illustrated by this extract from a telegram sent by Colonel Cailles to Aguinaldo on January 10, 1899: "Most urgent. An American interpreter has come to tell me to withdraw our forces in Maytubig fifty paces. I shall not draw back a step, and in place of withdrawing, I shall advance a little farther. He brings a letter from his general, in which he speaks to me as a friend. I said that from the day I knew that Maquinley (McKinley) opposed our independence I did not want any dealings with any American. War, war, is what we want. The Americans after this speech went off pale."

Aguinaldo approved the hostile attitude of Cailles since a reply in his handwriting stated, "I approve and applaud what you have done with the Americans, and zeal and valour always, also my beloved officers and soldiers there. I believe that they are playing us until the arrival of their reinforcements, but I shall send an ultimatum and remain always on the alert.--E. A. Jan. 10, 1899."

On January 31, 1899, the Minister of Interior of the revolutionary First Philippine Republic, Teodoro Sandiko, signed a decree stating that President Aguinaldo had directed that all idle lands be planted to provide food for the people in view of impending war with the Americans.

Outbreak of general hostilities 

Worcester gave General Otis' account of the opening of active hostilities,

Other sources name the two specific US soldiers involved in the first exchange of fire as Privates William Grayson and Orville Miller of the Nebraska Volunteers.

After the war had ended, and he had analyzed captured insurgent papers, Major Major J. R. M. Taylor wrote, "An attack on the United States forces was planned which should annihilate the little army in Manila, and delegations were appointed to secure the interference of foreign powers. The protecting cloak of pretense of friendliness to the United States was to be kept up until the last. While commissioners were appointed to negotiate with General Otis, secret societies were organized in Manila pledged to obey orders of the most barbarous character to kill and burn. The attack from without and the attack from within was to be on a set day and hour. The strained situation could not last. The spark was applied, either inadvertently or by design, on the 4th of February by an insurgent, willfully transgressing upon what, by their own admission, was within the agreed limits of the holding of the American troops. Hostilities resulted and the war was an accomplished fact."

War
On February 4, Aguinaldo declared, "That peace and friendly relations with the Americans be broken and that the latter be treated as enemies, within the limits prescribed by the laws of war." On June 2, 1899, the Malolos Congress enacted and ratified a declaration of war on the United States, which was publicly proclaimed on that same day by Pedro A. Paterno, the President of the Assembly.

As when they had fought the Spanish, the Filipino rebels did not do well in the field. Aguinaldo and his provisional government escaped after the capture of Malolos on March 31, 1899, and they were driven into northern Luzon. Peace feelers from members of Aguinaldo's cabinet failed in May when the American commander, General Ewell Otis, demanded an unconditional surrender. In 1901, Aguinaldo was captured and swore allegiance to the United States, which marked an end to the war.

First Philippine Commission

McKinley had appointed a five-person group, headed by Dr. Jacob Gould Schurman, president of Cornell University, on January 20, 1899, to investigate conditions in the islands and to make recommendations. The three civilian members of the Philippine Commission arrived in Manila on March 4, 1899, a month after the Battle of Manila, which had begun armed conflict between US and revolutionary Filipino forces. The commission published a proclamation containing assurances that the US was "anxious to establish in the Philippine Islands an enlightened system of government under which the Philippine people may enjoy the largest measure of home rule and the amplest liberty."

After meetings in April with revolutionary representatives, the commission requested authorization from McKinley to offer a specific plan. He authorized an offer of a government, consisting of "a Governor-General appointed by the President; cabinet appointed by the Governor-General; [and] a general advisory council elected by the people." The Revolutionary Congress voted unanimously to cease fighting and to accept peace, and on May 8, the revolutionary cabinet, headed by Apolinario Mabini, was replaced by a new "peace" cabinet, headed by Pedro Paterno. General Antonio Luna then arrested Paterno and most of his cabinet and returned Mabini and his cabinet to power. The commission then concluded, "The Filipinos are wholly unprepared for independence... there being no Philippine nation, but only a collection of different peoples."

In the report, which they issued to the president the next year, the commissioners acknowledged Filipino aspirations for independence but declared that the Philippines was not ready for it.

On November 2, 1899, the commission issued a preliminary report that stayted:

Specific recommendations included the establishment of civilian government as rapidly as possible (the American chief executive in the islands was then the military governor), including establishment of a bicameral legislature, autonomous governments on the provincial and municipal levels, and a system of free public elementary schools.

Second Philippine Commission

The Second Philippine Commission (the Taft Commission), appointed by McKinley on March 16, 1900 and headed by William Howard Taft, was granted legislative and limited executive powers. On September 1, the Taft Commission began to exercise legislative functions. Between September 1900 and August 1902, it issued 499 laws; established a judicial system, including a supreme court; drew up a legal code; and organized a civil service. The 1901 municipal code provided for popularly elected presidents, vice presidents, and councilors to serve on municipal boards. Members of the municipal boards were responsible for collecting taxes, maintaining municipal properties, undertaking necessary construction projects, and electing provincial governors.

Establishment of civil government
On March 3, 1901 the US Congress passed the Army Appropriation Act containing (along with the Platt Amendment on Cuba) the Spooner Amendment, which provided the President with the legislative authority to establish a civil government in the Philippines. Until then, the President had been administering the Philippines by virtue of his war powers. On July 1, 1901, civil government was inaugurated, with Taft as the Civil Governor. On February 3, 1903, the US Congress changed the title of Civil Governor to Governor-General.

A highly-centralized public school system was installed in 1901, using English as the medium of instruction. Since that created a heavy shortage of teachers, the Philippine Commission authorized the Secretary of Public Instruction to bring to the Philippines 600 teachers from the US, the so-called Thomasites. Free primary instruction to train the people for the duties of citizenship and avocation was enforced by the Taft Commission, according to instructions by McKinley. Also, the Catholic Church was disestablished, and a considerable amount of church land was purchased and redistributed.

Official end to war
The Philippine Organic Act of July 1902 approved, ratified, and confirmed McKinley's executive order establishing the Philippine Commission and stipulated that a bicameral Philippine Legislature would be established, composed of an elected lower house, the Philippine Assembly, and an appointed upper house, the Philippine Commission. The act also provided for extending the United States Bill of Rights to the Philippines.

On July 2, 1902, the Secretary of War telegraphed that the insurrection against the sovereign authority of the US had come to an end, with provincial civil governments established, and so the office of Military Governor was terminated. On July 4, Theodore Roosevelt, who had succeeded to the presidency after the assassination of McKinley on September 5, 1901, proclaimed a full and complete pardon and amnesty to all persons in the Philippine archipelago who had participated in the conflict.

On April 9, 2002, Philippine President Gloria Macapagal Arroyo proclaimed that the Philippine–American War had ended on April 16, 1902 with the surrender of General Miguel Malvar, and she declared the centennial anniversary of that date as a national working holiday and as a special non-working holiday in the Province of Batangas and in the Cities of Batangas, Lipa and Tanaun.

Later hostilities
Some sources have suggested that the war unofficially continued for nearly a decade since bands of guerrillas, quasi-religious armed groups, and other resistance groups continued to roam the countryside and to clash with US Army or Philippine Constabulary patrols. The US Army and the Philippine Constabulary continued hostilities against those resistance groups until 1913. Some historians consider these unofficial extensions to be part of the war.

Comparisons with the First Philippine Republic

See also
 History of the Philippines (1898–1946)
 First Philippine Republic
 Second Philippine Republic
 Insular Government of the Philippine Islands
 Commonwealth of the Philippines

References

Citations

Bibliography
 
 
 
 
 
 
 .
 (English translation by Sulpicio Guevara)
 
 
 
 
 
 
 

 

 
 (Introduction, Decolonizing the History of the Philippine–American War, by Paul A. Kramer dated December 8, 2005)
 
 

1898 establishments in the Philippines
1902 disestablishments in the Philippines
Philippine Islands
Philippines–United States military relations
Presidency of William McKinley
Presidency of Theodore Roosevelt
William Howard Taft
Provisional governments